Pride and Joy is a music video/live compilation by Stevie Ray Vaughan. It was the original video collection, spanning all of the music videos made from 1983-1989, plus a live track from MTV's Mardi Gras celebration in February 1987. Pride and Joy was also released in 2007 on DVD, expanded to include the video for "Little Wing", and three MTV Unplugged performances from January 30, 1990. The DVD also includes material for the Vaughan brothers' Family Style album and vintage television advertisements.

Track listing
Love Struck Baby
Cold Shot
Couldn't Stand The Weather
Change It
Superstition
I'm Leaving You (Commit A Crime) (live)
The House Is Rockin'
Crossfire
Little Wing
Rude Mood (acoustic) [from MTV Unplugged]
Pride and Joy (acoustic) [from MTV Unplugged]
Testify" (acoustic) [from MTV Unplugged]
TV Commercial for Couldn't Stand the Weather
TV Commercial for Soul to Soul
Tick Tock [The Vaughan Brothers]
Good Texan [The Vaughan Brothers]
The Vaughan Brothers EPK

Stevie Ray Vaughan video albums
1990 video albums
Live video albums
1990 live albums